The 2016 Arkansas Republican presidential primary was won by Donald Trump with a plurality 32.8% support over Senator Ted Cruz, who competed heavily in Arkansas and hailed from neighboring Texas, with 30.5% support. While Marco Rubio earned the endorsement of Arkansas Governor Asa Hutchinson, Ted Cruz competed aggressively with Trump for the state's Evangelical base. 

Twelve candidates appeared on the Republican presidential primary ballot.

Polling

Aggregate polls

Results

Analysis 
According to exit polls by Edison Research, Donald Trump carried 39% of non-college Republican voters in Arkansas. Trump also won with 39% of veterans, a key demographic for Republican candidates in the South. Cruz and Trump split Evangelical voters with 33% each, which gave way to a close statewide result in the primary.

Many pundits were perplexed by Trump's dominance among culturally conservative Southern whites who were expected to view him as immoral, but he benefitted from voters' racial, cultural, and economic angst that mattered more than shared values.

The week before the primary, Sarah Huckabee Sanders, daughter of former Arkansas Governor Mike Huckabee, joined Donald Trump's campaign.

See also
 2016 Arkansas Democratic presidential primary

References

Arkansas
Republican primary
March 2016 events in the United States
Arkansas Republican primaries